The Supply River is a perennial river located in the northern region of Tasmania, Australia.

Location and features
The river flows generally east-northeast, joined by two minor tributaries before reaching its confluence with the Tamar River at Robigana. From this point, the river enters Bass Strait. The river descends  over its  course. The river is transversed by the West Tamar Highway.

The river draws its name from the supply of fresh water at a waterfall just  from the river mouth, discovered in 1804 when the Lady Nelson sailed up the Tamar River. A  walking trail leads from the river mouth to the water mill.

See also

 Rivers of Tasmania

References

External links

Tamar River
Midlands (Tasmania)